Linyi railway station is a second-class railway station in Lanshan District, Linyi, Shandong. It is on the Yanzhou–Shijiusuo railway and Jiaozhou–Xinyi railway. It is under the jurisdiction of China Railway Jinan Group.

See also 

 Linyi North railway station
 Linyi East railway station

References 

Stations on the Yanzhou–Shijiusuo railway
Stations on the Jiaozhou–Xinyi railway
Railway stations in Linyi